Alphonso Castro K. Bondzie (1 February 1975 – 27 February 2022), better known as MC Skibadee, was a British recording artist and drum and bass MC.

Career
Bondzie started on City Sound Radio in 1993 featuring on the Live & Direct show, with DJs Pro-D and Cyrus, and by early 1995 he regularly featured at jungle music events such as Thunder & Joy and Spirit of the Jungle, as well as his regular spot on radio. By the end of 1995, he was resident for the London pirate radio station Kool FM, and regularly featured at events such as Jungle Fever, New Jack City, and Innersense. Along with MC Det of Kool FM, he launched a new project called 2Xfreestyle in late 1997, which involved putting a drum and bass tempo over a hip-hop beat, therefore creating a "double time" effect. He would often perform this style with its innovator Stevie Hyper D.

The single and subsequent video "Inside Me" was a success and after being accepted on MTV and The Box. In 1999, he received the first of three the Knowledge Awards for best MC, and three Accelerated culture awards. Since 2000, he began collaborating with MC Shabba D (also known as Shabba) which became the partnership commonly known as "S.A.S." and became synonymous with the raves Telepathy and One Nation. In 2003, he provided the vocals for Dillinja's UK chart-breaking "Twist Em Out".

In 2006 he won the 1Xtra award for best MC and in 2007 he won best MC southwest Drum n Bass award. In 2008 and 2009, Skibadee won best Lyrical MC and best Hype MC in the national Drum and bass awards and 2010 is the third year in a row as the best Crowd Hyper MC as well as the Stevie Hyper D Lifetime Achievement Award. In 2010, he won best MC at the Drum & Bass Arena Awards.

Personal life and death
Bondzie was born in Waterloo, London on 1 February 1975. In 2019, he auctioned two outfits to raise money for the Sickle Cell Society. He would later succumb to sickle cell disease. He died on 27 February 2022, at the age of 47.

References

External links
 Official website
 

1967 births
2022 deaths
Black British male rappers
English drum and bass musicians
People from the London Borough of Lambeth
Rappers from London